There are many temples dedicated to the Hindu deity Mariamman around the world. Most of them are of Tamil origin. Temples include:

Mariamman temple, Ooty
Mariamman Koil, Pilakool
Mariamman Temple, Ho Chi Minh City
Punnainallur Mariamman
Samayapuram Mariamman Temple
Sri Mahamariamman Temple, Kuala Lumpur
Sri Mariamman Temple, Bangkok
Sri Mariamman Temple, Medan
Sri Mariamman Temple, Penang
Sri Mariamman Temple, Singapore

Mariamman temples